Adam Eckersley Band are a musical group based on The Central Coast, Australia, currently signed to Lost Highway Australia. The band formed in 2010 and, as of 2020, consists of members Adam Eckersley on lead vocals, electric guitar and harp, Ben Elliott on drums, Mitch Cairns on bass guitar and backing vocals and Dan Biederman on Hammond Organ and keyboard. Their debut album The First Album was released on 14 March 2014.

Discography

Studio albums

EPs

Awards and nominations

APRA Awards
The APRA Awards are presented annually from 1982 by the Australasian Performing Right Association (APRA), "honouring composers and songwriters".

|-
| 2015
|Adam Eckersley, Danelle Leverett and Jason Reeves
|Country Work of the Year for "Give Her the World"
|

CMAA Awards
The Country Music Awards of Australia are an annual awards ceremony held during the Tamworth Country Music Festival, in Tamworth, New South Wales, celebrating recording excellence in the Australian country music industry.

|-
|2015
|Adam Eckersley Band
|New Talent of the Year
| 
|-
|2016
|The Second Album
|Group or Duo of the Year
|

References

External links 

 

APRA Award winners
Australian rock music groups
Musical groups established in 2010
2010 establishments in Australia